Doimukh is a small town in the Indian state of Arunachal Pradesh, in the Papum Pare district. It is located 18 km south of Yupia, the district headquarters. Its PIN code is 791112. It is one of the 60 constituencies of the Legislative Assembly of Arunachal Pradesh. The current MLA (as of July 2019) of this constituency is Tana Hali Tara. It is the home of Nyishi tradition and tribe.

Notable people 

 Taba Chake (born 1993), guitarist and musician, born in Doimukh

See also
List of constituencies of Arunachal Pradesh Legislative Assembly
Arunachal Pradesh Legislative Assembly

References 

Villages in Papum Pare district